Prozac is a proprietary name for the antidepressant drug fluoxetine.

Prozac or similar permutations may also refer to:

Music
 Prozac+, an Italian punk band
 Prozak (rapper), American rapper
 Prozzäk, a Canadian pop band
 "Prosac", a 1996 single by Tomcraft

Other uses
 Prozac Nation (book), a memoir by Elizabeth Wurtzel published in 1994
 Prozac Nation (film), a 2001 film based around the book
 Prozac the Bear, a talking pharmaceutical from the webcomic Triangle and Robert

See also